Dabola is a prefecture located in the Faranah Region of Guinea. The capital is Dabola. The prefecture covers an area of 6,350 km.² and has an estimated population of 182,951.

Sub-prefectures
The prefecture is divided administratively into 9 sub-prefectures:
 Dabola-Centre
 Arfamoussaya
 Banko
 Bissikrima
 Dogomet
 Kankama
 Kindoyé
 Konindou
 N'Déma 

Prefectures of Guinea
Faranah Region